Kłodawa may refer to the following places:
Kłodawa in Greater Poland Voivodeship (west-central Poland)
Kłodawa, Lubusz Voivodeship (west Poland)
Kłodawa, Subcarpathian Voivodeship (south-east Poland)
Kłodawa, Chojnice County in Pomeranian Voivodeship (north Poland)
Kłodawa, Gdańsk County in Pomeranian Voivodeship (north Poland)